This is a list of professional wrestling promotions in Great Britain and Ireland, including England, Scotland, Wales, the Republic of Ireland, Northern Ireland, and the Isle of Man and lists both active and notable defunct professional wrestling promotions from the 1950s to the present day.

England

Ireland

Scotland

Wales

See also

List of professional wrestling promotions
List of women's wrestling promotions
List of professional wrestling promotions in Europe

References

British professional wrestling promotions
Irish professional wrestling promotions
Promotions in the United Kingdom
Ireland sport-related lists
United Kingdom sport-related lists